Men's basketball at the 2006 Asian Games was held in Doha from 23 November to 15 December 2006.

Squads

Results
All times are Arabia Standard Time (UTC+03:00)

Round 1

Group A

Group B

Group C

Group D

Preliminary

Group E

Group F

Classification 9th–12th

Semifinals

Classification 11th–12th

Classification 9th–10th

Final round

Quarterfinals

Classification 5th–8th

Semifinals

Classification 7th–8th

Classification 5th–6th

Bronze medal match

Gold medal match

Final standing

References

Results

External links
Official website

Men